Cornelia Brierly (1913–2012) was an American architect and one of the first five women to study architecture at Carnegie Tech. She was the first female fellow of Frank Lloyd Wright in Taliesin, 1934.

Life
Cornelia Brierly was born April 12, 1913, in Mifflin County, Pennsylvania. She studied briefly at Cornell University and the University of Pittsburgh, before enrolling in Carnegie Tech becoming one of the first five women to study architecture in the program. In 1934 she joined the Taliesin Fellowship under Frank Lloyd Wright. She worked on Wright’s Broadacre City plan, building models in Arizona and traveling to Pittsburgh, Pennsylvania and Washington, D.C. to explain the ideas to a wider audience.

She studied with Wright for 10 years before starting a private practice with her husband Peter Berndtson. In 1956 she returned to the Frank Lloyd Wright Foundation working as an architectural designer, interior decorator and landscape architect. She served as Honorary Chairman and Trustee of the Foundation.

Brierly died August 24, 2012 at age 99.

Major buildings and projects
Models for Broadacre City project
Taliesin West (contributor), Scottsdale, Arizona
Hulda and Louise Notz House, 1940, West Mifflin, Pennsylvania
Arthur Jeffrey House (with Peter Berndtson), 1947, Allison Park, Pennsylvania
Edward Weinberger House (with Peter Berndtson), 1948, Squirrel Hill, Pennsylvania
Joseph Katz/McComb House (with Peter Berndtson), 1950, West Mifflin, Pennsylvania
Abraam Steinberg House (with Peter Berndtson), 1951, Squirrel Hill, Pennsylvania
F. Esther Fineman House (with Peter Berndtson), 1952, Stanton Heights, Pennsylvania
George Brayman House (with Peter Berndtson), 1953, Ben Avon Heights, Pennsylvania
Saul Lipkind House (with Peter Berndtson),1954, Swisshelm Park, Pennsylvania
Pearl Palace (interior design and furniture with John deKoven Hill), c.1972, Mehrshahr, Alborz Province.

Further reading
Brierly, Cornelia. Tales of Taliesin: A Memoir of Fellowship. Petaluma, CA: Pomegranate, 2000.

References

1913 births
2012 deaths
American women architects
Carnegie Mellon University College of Fine Arts alumni
People from Mifflin County, Pennsylvania